Jorge Soares da Silva (born 13 January 1972) is a Portuguese former footballer who played as a goalkeeper.

Football career
Born in Lamego, Viseu District, Silva emerged through FC Porto's youth system, but could never be more than third choice with its first team. In the 1995–96 season he was part of the Primeira Liga-winning squad by playing four minutes in one game, and previously made his professional debut at Rio Ave FC.

Silva spent the better part of his career with two modest clubs in the top flight, S.C. Salgueiros – who had previously loaned him to Porto – and C.D. Santa Clara, reaching the Portugal national team for his only cap on 15 November 2000, where he featured one minute in a friendly with Israel after coming on as a substitute for Quim. In the 2003–04 campaign he played with the Azores side in the second tier and, from there onwards, competed mainly in the third.

In the summer of 2008, 36-year-old Silva signed with U.D. Oliveirense, recently promoted to division two. After one season he called it quits, joining the club's coaching staff as goalkeeper coach. However, a string of injuries propelled him back to action, and he eventually appeared in five matches during 2009–10 (three wins, one loss, one draw, seven goals conceded), with his team narrowly missing out on another promotion. In June 2010, he retired for good and returned to his previous post.

Personal life
Silva's younger brother, Francisco, was also a footballer. A defender, they shared teams at C.D. Trofense and Oliveirense.

References

External links

1972 births
Living people
People from Lamego
Portuguese footballers
Association football goalkeepers
Primeira Liga players
Liga Portugal 2 players
Segunda Divisão players
FC Porto players
Rio Ave F.C. players
S.C. Salgueiros players
C.D. Santa Clara players
S.C. Dragões Sandinenses players
U.S.C. Paredes players
C.D. Trofense players
AC Vila Meã players
U.D. Oliveirense players
Portugal youth international footballers
Portugal international footballers
Sportspeople from Viseu District